Ted Tunnell is a history professor and author in the United States. He has taught history at Virginia Commonwealth University. He wrote a book about the Reconstruction era in Louisiana, edited Marshall Twitchell's autobiography, and wrote a book about him. He appears on film in an interview for the show American Experience discussing Twitchell.

In 2010, Tunnell was quoted in an article about a Virginia textbook erroneously stating that many African Americans fought for the Confederacy during the American Civil War stating there were only a handful. Regarding the claim that there were thousands, he stated: "I would say all professional historians at universities would say it's grossly exaggerated."

Works
Crucible of Reconstruction: War, Radicalism and Race in Louisiana, 1862-1877 Louisiana State University Press (1984)
Carpetbagger from Vermont: The Autobiography of Marshall Harvey Twitchell, editor, Baton Rouge, 1989
Edge of the Sword: The Ordeal of Carpetbagger Marshall H. Twitchell in the Civil War and Reconstruction Louisiana State University Press (2000)
"Creating "The Propaganda of History": Southern Editors and the Origins of "Carpetbagger and Scalawag"", November 2006, The Journal of Southern History 72(4):789-822 DOI:10.2307/27649233
"Henry Clay Warmoth" American National Biography (1999)

References

Historians of the United States
Historians of the American Civil War

Year of birth missing (living people)
Living people